Michael Davies, popularly known by his stage name Sundaygar Dearboy, is a Liberian  singer, songwriter and record producer from Grand Bassa County. He sings primarily in Bassa and Liberian English and has released several studio albums, including See Boyee, Don’t Live With Woman (2007) and Rebirth (2012). He was named the Liberian Musician of the Year in 2005-2006, and has produced 13 albums to date.

Life and music career
Sundaygar Dearboy was born in District 2, Grand Bassa County, Liberia. He is the father of two and the guardian of several others. Dearboy graduated with a degree in criminal justice from AME Zion College. He is the project manager for Liberia Trading & Investment Company (LINTRACO), one of Liberia's trading groups. Dearboy has a significant following among Liberians in the diaspora, particularly in the United States. Speaking on the challenges currently facing the Liberian music industry, Dearboy said, "Not many local artists listen to other music and try to emulate or learn from them. Plus, the local market is not accustomed to promoting what belongs to them. They prefer something from outside. Perhaps, the generally quality of production does not meet the standard as those produced in other countries." Dearboy produced "Let Us Vote Ma Ellen", the official campaign song for the Unity Party. The song was released during Ellen Johnson Sirleaf's 2005 presidential campaign. Following the song's release, Dearboy's music career hit a political low for nearly four years. He revived his career by releasing "Bayjay", a song endorsed by the Liberian populace. "Bayjay" won Song of the Year at the 2005 Liberian Entertainment Awards.

In 2007, Dearboy released Don't Live With Women, an album that contains the single "Bayjay" and the song "Evil Genius". The album was sponsored by Cellcom and launched at the Antoinette Tubman Stadium. On May 26, 2007, Dearboy performed at UNIBOA's 17th National Convention in Woonsocket, Rhode Island. On June 10, 2012, he released his eight studio album Rebirth. Distributed by RK Enterprises, it features guest appearances from Tupee, Carol Kaifumba and Ghanaian artist Odefor. The album comprises seven songs, including "Gbema", "Zima-Day" and the dancehall track "Monkeh". In June 2013, The Inquirer newspaper reported that Dearboy and several other musicians criticized and belittled the establishment of the Arts & Culture Council of Liberia. They said the organization does not, in any way, represent the views and aspirations of the Liberian entertainment industry. On December 13, 2013, he and other Liberian musicians performed at the National County Sports Meet (NCSM) official kick off, an event sponsored by the Liberia National Culture Union (LINU) and the Ministry of Information, Cultural Affairs and Tourism (MICAT).

In 2020, Dearboy collaborated with Takun J, DenG, Tan Tan, Soul Smiter, Odemz, and Amaze to produce the hipco song "Sanitize". The artists released the song in order to raise awareness about Covid-19 and encourage Liberians to practice good hygiene.

NPFL controversy
In 2008, Dearboy admitted to being a member of Charles Taylor's defunct National Patriotic Front of Liberia rebel movement. During the Truth and Reconciliation Commission (TRC) public hearings, Dearboy said he was forcefully enlisted into the NPFL, in 1992, while searching for his girlfriend in Grand Bassa County. Three witnesses stated that Dearboy raped a young woman and murdered several men, women, and children in Grand Bassa County during the civil war. Dearboy denied the accusation leveled against him and expressed penitence for his role in the rebel movement, saying, "The past is what no one is in control of. No one is reading my mind except God. But I want to say if I hurt anyone during the war, I am sorry, very, very sorry from the depth of my heart. I am sorry for whatever role I played during the revolution."

Personal life
In an interview with Radio France Internationale in 2015, Dearboy said 19 members of his family died from the 2014 Ebola outbreak.

Awards and nominations

Discography

Studio albums
See Boyee 
Don’t Live With Woman (2007)
Rebirth (2012)

See also
List of Liberian musicians

References

Liberian songwriters
People from Grand Bassa County
Liberian rebels
Living people
Liberian singers
Bassa people (Liberia)